The 2009 AMA Supercross season (for sponsorship reasons, the Monster Energy AMA Supercross Championship) was the thirty-sixth AMA Supercross Championship season. It was also the second season with the World Supercross Championship designation. James Stewart Jr. claimed his second title, after winning eleven of the seventeen rounds.

Riders
 Riders denoted by state of birth, unless an overseas rider.

Calendar
Riders denoted by state of birth, unless an overseas rider.

Championship standings

See also
 Supercross; for champions of the supporting East and West Lites series.

References

External links
 The official website of the AMA Supercross championship

AMA Supercross
AMA Supercross Championship